This list of electoral wards in Powys includes council wards, which elect councillors to Powys County Council and community wards, which elect councillors to community councils.

Powys is administered by Powys County Council and has 68 (73 until 2022) elected councillors representing 60 (73 until 2022) council wards. Although it is a unitary authority, the highway functions of the council, along with the allocation of small grants, are delegated to the three Shire Committees.  

Local elections take place every five years. Some of the electoral wards are coterminous with communities (civil parishes) of the same name. There are 112 communities in the principal area. Nearly all communities have a local community council.

2022 ward changes
In 2021 a large number of proposals by the Local Democracy and Boundary Commission for Wales, to reduce the number of wards in Powys from 73 to 60, with the number of councillors dropping from 73 to 68. As a result of ward mergers, some of the new wards would become multi-member.

Twenty six ward boundaries would be unaffected: Builth, Caersws, Churchstoke, Cwm-twrch, Dolforwyn, Glantwymyn, Gwernyfed, Hay, Llandrindod North, Llandrinio, Llandysilio,Llanfyllin, Llanrhaeadr-ymMochnant/Llansilin, Llansantffraid, Machynlleth, Maescar/Llywel, Newtown East, Newtown Llanllwchaiarn North, Newtown Llanllwchaiarn West, Old Radnor, Rhayader,Rhiwcynon, Talgarth, Talybont-on-Usk, Tawe-Uchaf, Ynyscedwyn. 

Eight multi-member wards were created, electing two councillors each.

Post-2022 wards
The following table lists the post-2022 county/community wards, the numbers of councillors elected and the communities they cover.

Montgomeryshire (North Powys)
Montgomeryshire has 29 wards electing 31 county councillors.

Radnorshire (Mid Powys)
Radnorshire area has 12 wards electing 14 county councillors.

Brecknockshire (South Powys)
Brecknockshire area has 19 wards electing 23 county councillors. 

* = Communities which elect a community council
c = Ward coterminous with community of the same name

Pre-2022 wards
The following table lists the pre-2022 county/community wards, the numbers of councillors elected and the communities they cover.

Brecknockshire had 24 councillors, Radnorshire had 15 and Montgomeryshire had 34.

Montgomeryshire (North Powys)

Radnorshire (Mid Powys)

Brecknockshire (South Powys)

* = Communities which elect a community council
c = Ward coterminous with community of the same name

See also
 List of electoral wards in Wales
 List of places in Powys (categorised)

References

Sources
 Election Maps, Ordnance Survey. Retrieved 21 January 2018.
 Town and Community Councils, Powys County Council. Retrieved 21 January 2018.
 Your Councillors by Ward, Powys County Council. Retrieved 21 January 2018.

 
Powys